Young Scientist Programme, otherwise known as YUVIKA (abbreviation for "YUva VIgyani KAryakram") in an annual space education and training programme by ISRO with funding from Department of Space, India. The programme was initiated by government of India "to create an early interest in Space Technologies among youngsters". The program was officially announced on January 18, 2019, by ISRO's chief K. Sivan and inaugurated four months later on May 17.

Overview 
The programme was announced by ISRO chief K. Sivan on January 18, 2019, through Student Outreach Programme held by Indian Space Research Organisation. In the announcement, Sivan urged the state governments and respective education departments to actively cooperate to make the programme a success.

History 
ISRO chief, during the announcement said that "the programme was aimed to inculcate and nurture space research interest in young minds." Their selection basis based on "academic performance and extracurricular activities", Sivan also added "students from rural backgrounds would be given preference in selection criteria".

The programme also includes invited talks by scientists, along with scheduled lab and facilities visits in the country. Apart from these, ISRO also said that there will be sessions for discussions with experts in Space Technologies. ISRO is also determined to organise practical and feedback sessions for the students.

YUVIKA 19
The programme commenced on May 13, 2019, for the first time, as a two-week residential training programme held each summer holidays. The participation in programme was meant only for students getting in high school in the academic year 2019–2020.

The shortlisted students attended the 2 weeks training programme at four centres of ISRO namely, Vikram Sarabhai Space Centre (VSSC), Thiruvananthapuram; U R Rao Satellite Centre (URSC), Bengaluru; Space Applications Centre (SAC), Ahmedabad and North Eastern Space Applications Centre (NESAC), Shillong.

The programme concluded on May 25, 2019, at the respective centers. The participants of YUVIKA'19 also witnessed the launch of 'RH200 sounding rocket'.

YUVIKA'20
YUVIKA'20 was to be held in May 2020, but was postponed in light of ongoing COVID-19 Pandemic in India.

Timeline 
And it is cancel only in year 2020

References 

Science education in India
Astronomy education events
ISRO programs
Youth science
Recurring events established in 2019
2019 establishments in India